Delaine may refer to:

Delaine Buses, bus operator in Lincolnshire, England
Delaine (cloth), a kind of mixed cloth.
Delaine Merino, type of sheep
Emma Delaine (born 2003), French rhythmic gymnast 
Thomas Delaine, French football player
Phillip DeLaine, politician in Ohio, United States